This list is about Malmö FF players with between 1 and 24 league appearances. For a list of all Malmö FF players with a Wikipedia article, see Category:Malmö FF players. For the current Malmö FF first-team squad, see First-team squad.

Malmö Fotbollförening, also known simply as Malmö FF, is a Swedish professional association football club based in Malmö. The club is affiliated with Skånes Fotbollförbund (The Scanian Football Association), and plays its home games at Stadion. Formed on 24 February 1910, Malmö FF is the most successful club in Sweden in terms of trophies won. The club have won the most league titles of any Swedish club with twenty-one, a joint record eighteen Swedish championship titles and a record fourteen national cup titles. The team competes in Allsvenskan as of the 2015 season; this is Malmö FF's 15th consecutive season in the top flight, and their 80th overall. The main rivals of the club are Helsingborgs IF, IFK Göteborg and, historically, IFK Malmö.

Since Malmö FF's first competitive match, more than 450 players have made a league appearance for the club. Many of these players have spent only a short period of their career at Malmö FF before seeking opportunities in other teams; some players had their careers cut short by injury, while others left for other reasons. Jari Litmanen transferred to the club after having a very successful career in various European clubs, Ajax being the most prominent. However Litmanen's two year Malmö FF career was cut short by persistent injury problems. Igor Sypniewski who transferred to Malmö before the club's 2004 title winning season only played eight matches and scored two goals before leaving the club due to personal problems, which led to the club releasing him due to breach of contract.

As of 31 October 2015, a total of 240 players have played fewer than 25 competitive matches for the club. Of those players, 18 are still playing for the club and can add to their total. Three former players – Per-Åke Åkesson, Jesper Bech and Ove Blomberg – each made 24 appearances during their spell at Malmö FF. Johan Wiland, Felipe Carvalho and Nikola Đurđić are the most recent players to have made their first league appearances for the club.

Key

General
Appearances and goals are for first-team competitive league matches only, including Allsvenskan, Svenska Serien, Superettan and Division 2 matches. Substitute appearances included.
Players are listed according to the total number of league games played, the player with the most goals scored is ranked higher if two or more players are tied.
Positions are listed according to the tactical formations that were employed at the time. Thus the change in the names of defensive and midfield reflects the tactical evolution that occurred from the 1960s onwards. The year 1960 is used as a breaking point in this list for the use of names of defensive and midfield positions.

Table headers
 Nationality – If a player played international football, the country/countries he played for are shown. Otherwise, the player's nationality is given as their country of birth.
 Malmö FF career – The year of the player's first appearance for Malmö FF to the year of his last appearance.
 Appearances – The number of games played.
 Goals – The number of goals scored.

Players
Statistics correct as of match played 19 July 2016.

Footnotes

References

 
Players
Malmö, FF
Association football player non-biographical articles